Novaustrosimulium is a subgenus of Austrosimulium, a genus made up of black flies.  The flies in this subgenus are found exclusively in Australia.

Species
A. bancrofti Taylor, 1918 (type species)
A. furiosum Skuse, 1889
A. magnum Mackerras & Mackerras, 1955
A. pestilens Mackerras & Mackerras, 1948
A. torrentium Tonnoir, 1925
A. victoriae Roubaud, 1906

References

External links 

Simuliidae
Insect subgenera